The Anarchist-Communist Federation of Occitania (Federacion anarquista-comunista d'Occitania, FACO) was a platformist federation, founded by Guy Malouvier, which operated in Occitania from 1969 to 1975.

References

Bibliography 

 Philippe Martel,  Revolutionary or nationalist? Occitan poetry after 1968 , Field (journal), n ° 41, September 2003, full text.
 Collective, under the dir. from Jean Maitron,  Anarchism, here and there, yesterday and today , Le Mouvement social, n ° 83, April - June 1973, full text.
 René Furth,  Ethnic minorities and Nationalisms , Interrogations, n ° 5, December 1975, full text.
 Guillaume Davranche and Grégoire Mariman,  File 68: Rolf Dupuy and Guy Malouvier: 'Each of these words counted: organization; revolutionary ; anarchiste ", September 6, 2007, Alternative libertaire n ° 173, May 2008, full text.
 Système universitaire de documentation - notice.
 
 International Institute of Social History (Amsterdam) - notice.
 Centre International de Recherches sur l'Anarchisme (Lausanne): bibliographic notice.
 International Federation of Libertarian Studies and Documentation Centers, notice.
 Anarchist Federation,  Histoire du mouvement libertaire 1954-1980 , 1969.
 Reproduction of the cover of issue 1 of Occitanie libertaire.

Defunct anarchist organizations in France